The 2016–17 Scottish League One (known as Ladbrokes League One for sponsorship reasons) was the 22nd season in the current format of 10 teams in the third-tier of Scottish football. The fixtures were published on 17 June 2016.

Ten teams contested the league: Airdrieonians, Albion Rovers, Alloa Athletic, Brechin City, East Fife, Livingston, Peterhead, Queen's Park, Stenhousemuir and Stranraer.

Teams
The following teams changed division since the 2015–16 season.

To League One

Promoted from Scottish League Two
 East Fife
 Queen's Park

Relegated from Scottish Championship
 Alloa Athletic
 Livingston

From League One

Relegated to Scottish League Two
 Forfar Athletic
 Cowdenbeath

Promoted to Scottish Championship
 Dunfermline Athletic
 Ayr United

Stadia and locations

Personnel and kits

Managerial changes

League summary

League table

Positions by round

Results
Teams play each other four times, twice in the first half of the season (home and away) and twice in the second half of the season (home and away), making a total of 36 games.

First half of season

Second half of season

Season statistics

Scoring

Top scorers

Hat-tricks

Discipline

Player

Yellow cards

Red cards

Club

Yellow cards

Red cards

Attendances

Awards

Monthly awards

League One play-offs
Peterhead the second bottom team, entered into a 4-team playoff with the 2nd-4th placed teams in 2016–17 Scottish League Two; Annan Athletic, Forfar Athletic and Montrose.

Semi-finals

First leg

Second leg

Final
The winners of the semi-finals will compete against one another over two legs, with the winner competing in the 2017–18 Scottish League One.

First leg

Second leg

References

Scottish League One seasons
3
3
Scotland